Anand Krishnamoorthi is an Indian film sound designer, sound editor  and production sound mixer.

Early life
Anand first appeared in Mani Ratnam's film Anjali  and later made appearances in several other films, notably May Madham, Sathi Leelavathi, Aasai, Thalapathi and several Tamil TV Serials till 1995.

Education
Anand obtained a Bachelor of Science in Visual Communication from the Loyola College, Chennai and a master's in Electronic Media from the Anna University, Chennai. He later obtained an M.A. in Film and Television Production from the University of Bristol in 2005.

Career
Krishnamoorthi assisted Tamil Film Director Balu Mahendra from 2001-2002. After his M.A., Krishnamoorthi also worked as a Sound Trainee with the British Broadcasting Corporation from 2005-2006.

Krishnamoorthi reentered mainstream Tamil Cinema as a Production Mixer for Marmayogi which was later shelved after pre production in 2008. He then handled Dialogue Editing and Sound for Unnaipol Oruvan (English: Someone Like You)
 in 2009 wherein he also made a brief appearance on screen as an IIT dropout turned hacker.

Krishnamoorthi was the Supervising Sound Editor on Vishwaroopam, directed by Kamal Haasan, which was produced in Auro 3D format. He later led the ADR for the popular film Kalyana Samayal Saadham. He co-directed On a Quest, a film produced by the Chinmaya Mission on the life of Chinmayananda Saraswati which received a limited release around the world. He has directed a shortfilm of Suicide Counselling, an eye opener for students with suicidal tendencies. 

Since 2015, he has led the sound design of Madras Talkies projects starting with O Kadal Kanmani, Kaatru Veliyidai, Chekka Chivantha Vaanam, the Payasam: Bheebatsa segment of the anthology Navarasa and is currently working on the forthcoming Ponniyin Selvan. In 2017, he was the sound designer for AR Murugadoss's action thriller Spyder and 2018, led the sound design on Director Vasanth's Sivaranjaniyum Innum Sila Pengalum which was notable for having no background score and reliant entirely upon sound design and effects.

Since 2020, Anand has been editing the podcast "The Moving Curve", hosted by Rukmini S, a data journalist based in Chennai, on COVID-19 related data in India. In 2020 this podcast was awarded the Emergent Ventures Covid-19 India Prize by Marginal Revolution.

Filmography
Sound designer
Unnaipol Oruvan (2009) (dialogue editing) (sound design)
Manmadhan Ambu (2010) (supervising sound editor) (sound recordist)
Shadows of Silence (2010) (sound editor)
Vishwaroopam (2012) (sound editor)
Kalyana Samayal Saadham (2013) (ADR)
 On a quest (2014) (co-director) 
 O Kadhal Kanmani (2015) (Sound Designer)
 Kuttrame Thandanai (2016) (Supervising Sound Editor)
Spyder (2017) (Sound designer)
 Kaatru Veliyidai (2017) (Supervising Sound Editor)
Chekka Chivantha Vaanam (2018) (Audiographer)
Payasam: Bhibatsa (2021) (Sound Designer)
Sivaranjiniyum Innum Sila Pengalum (2021) (Sound Designer)
Ponniyin Selvan (in production)

Actor
Anjali (1990)
Thalapathi (1991)
Thalaivasal (1992)
May Madham (1994)
Sathi Leelavathi (1995)
Aasai (1995)
Unnaipol Oruvan (2009)

References

External links
 
 

Living people
Year of birth missing (living people)
Indian male child actors
Tamil screenwriters
Indian sound designers
Padma Seshadri Bala Bhavan schools alumni
Loyola College, Chennai alumni
Anna University alumni
20th-century Indian male actors
Indian sound editors
Production sound mixers